The 2019–20 Champions Hockey League was the sixth season of the Champions Hockey League, a European ice hockey tournament. 32 teams are competing in the tournament, and qualification was on sporting merits only. The six founding leagues are represented by between three and five teams (based on a three-year league ranking), while seven "challenge leagues" are represented by one team each. One place was awarded to the champion of the 2018–19 Champions Hockey League as well as a wild card spot selected by the board. Unlike in the first three editions of the tournament, founding teams did not automatically qualify.

Swedish team Frölunda HC successfully defended their Champions Hockey League title, defeating Czech team Mountfield HK 3–1 in the final to win the European Trophy for a fourth time. For the first time in the history of the league, the final was held in the Czech Republic as Mountfield HK earned the right to host the game at ČPP Arena.

Team allocation
A total of 32 teams from 13 different European first-tier leagues are participating in the 2019–20 Champions Hockey League. There were 24 teams from the six founding leagues, as well as the national champions from Slovakia, Norway, Denmark, France, Belarus, the United Kingdom and Poland qualified. Out of the founding leagues Sweden and Switzerland were allocated 5 teams, Finland and Czech Republic 4 with Austria and Germany given 3. Because no league was allowed more than five teams, the winner of the 2018–19 Champions Hockey League won a berth but at the expense of a place for their league.

Due to the fact that Arlan Kokshetau of the Kazakhstan Hockey Championship were ineligible to qualify for the Champions Hockey League despite winning the 2018–19 Continental Cup, it was announced that the board would select a Wild Card team in its place. On 13 February, the Champions Hockey League announced that the Belfast Giants as Continental Cup runners-up had been approved to take part as the Wild Card entry.

The qualification for these places was set out in the rules as follows:

 CHL champions
 National league champions (play-off winners)
 Regular season winners
 Regular season runners-up
 Regular season third-placed team
 Regular season fourth-placed team
 Regular season fifth-placed team

For the Austrian Hockey League teams are however picked in this order:
 League champions
 Regular season winners
 Pick Round winners
 Pick Round runners-up
 Losing playoff finalists

Note: the United Kingdom is the lone exception as the EIHL, in line with their traditions, determine their national champion following the regular season (not in the playoffs).

Teams

Group stage

For the group stage, the teams were drawn into 8 groups of 4 teams. Each team played home and away against every other team for a total of 6 games. The best 2 teams qualify to the round of 16.

Pots
The reigning CHL champions is the top seeded team and therefore given a place in pot 1. In the top pot there were also be the reigning champions of the six founding leagues and the regular season winner of SHL. The 16 remaining teams from the founding leagues were placed to pots 2 and 3. The fourth pot include the playoff champions from the seven challenge leagues and the Belfast Giants, the wild card team following the 2018–19 IIHF Continental Cup.

Group A

Group B

Group C

Group D

Group E

Group F

Group G

Group H

Group stage tie-breaking criteria
If two teams were tied in points after the group stage is finished, the teams precedence is decided by head-to-head games. If the teams are still tied after that, then the team that was ranked higher prior to the tournament took precedence. When comparing head-to-head results, the following criteria was applied:

 more points in games against the other tied team
 better goal difference in games against the other tied team
 more goals scored against the other tied team
 more goals scored in a single game against the other tied team
 overtime wins against the other tied team
 more goals scored in the two game winning shot competitions
 higher position in the 2016–17 CHL club ranking

Playoffs

Qualified teams

Format 
In each round except the final, the teams played two games and the aggregate score decided which team advanced. As a rule, the first leg was hosted by the team who had the inferior record in the tournament with the second leg being played on the home ice of the other team. If aggregate score is tied, a sudden death overtime followed. If the overtime is scoreless, the team who wins the shoot out competition advances.

The final was played on the home ice of the team who had the better record in the tournament.

Bracket 
The eight group winners and the eight second-placed teams advanced to the Round of 16. The teams were divided into two seeding groups and group winners were randomly drawn against runners-up. Teams who had faced each other in the group stage could not be drawn against each other in the round of 16. The draw took place in Helsinki, Finland on 18 October 2019.

Note:
The teams listed on top of each tie were runners up in the group stage and play the first leg at home. The bottom team were group winners and play the second leg at home. Skellefteå AIK, however, would play their first leg at home in their tie against Djurgårdens IF.
The order of the legs (which team starts at home) in the future rounds may be changed as the team with the best record should have the second game at home.

Final

Statistics

Scoring leaders
The following players led the league in points.

Leading goaltenders
The following goaltenders led the league in save percentage, provided that they have played at least 40% of their team's minutes.

References 

2019
Champions